Burrinjuck, an electoral district of the Legislative Assembly in the Australian state of New South Wales was created in 1950 and abolished in 2015.


Election results

Elections in the 2010s

2011

Elections in the 2000s

2007

2003

Elections in the 1990s

1999

1995

1991

Elections in the 1980s

1988

1984

1981

Elections in the 1970s

1978

1976

1973

1971

Elections in the 1960s

1968

1965

1962

Elections in the 1950s

1959

1956

1953

1950

References

New South Wales state electoral results by district